Pauline Hanson: Please Explain! is a 2016 political documentary television film directed by Anna Broinowski exploring the history of the Australian political figure Pauline Hanson and the One Nation party as well as the controversy and debate in which both have been surrounded. The documentary features critics, commentators and former advisors, as well as archival footage.

The documentary premiered on the Special Broadcasting Service (SBS) in Australia shortly after Hanson's election to the  Australian senate at the 2016 federal election. The documentary was funded by Screen Australia and Screen NSW.

Featured people
 Pauline Hanson
 Marcia Langton
 Helen Sham-Ho
 Alan Jones
 John Howard
 Neville Roach AO
 Linda Burney
 Tracey Curro
 David Oldfield
 Margo Kingston
 John Pasquarelli
 Thiam Ang
 David Ettridge

Reception 
The Guardian reviewed the documentary, saying that "We need Hanson exposed for what she is and what she's for, and that's what Broinowski’s documentary does so well: it illuminates a hare-brained and bizarre woman, and the political cynics who direct her."

The New Daily published an analysis of the program by Denise Eriksen, writing that "it’s one of the best television programmes you are likely to see all year."

Hanson livestreamed herself watching and commenting upon the documentary, stating that many of her critics misunderstood her comments due to her always being under public scrutiny. Mashable remarked upon Hanson's stream, dubbed the "Pauline Hanson 'social media echo chamber'" by The Sydney Morning Herald, which they felt was "the weirdest thing you'll see on the internet all day".

See also
 Politics of Australia

References

External links
 Pauline Hanson: Please Explain!, SBS articles

2016 television films
2016 films
2016 documentary films
Australian documentary films
Special Broadcasting Service original programming
Documentary films about politics
2010s political films
Australian political films
Pauline Hanson